Cotyledon is one of some 35 genera of succulent plants in the family Crassulaceae. Mostly from Southern Africa, they also occur throughout the drier parts of Africa as far north as the Arabian Peninsula. Ten of its species are mostly confined to South Africa, where unlike Tylecodon, they occur commonly in both the winter and summer rainfall regions. They may be found on coastal flats and rocky hillsides, or as cremnophytes on cliff faces. Their decussate, evergreen leaves are very variable in shape, even within some species, but the flowers are, apart from colour, very similar.

Description

Members of the genus are shrublets, generally succulent, with fleshily woody, brittle stems and persistent succulent leaves.

The leaves are opposite. Leaf pairs generally are oriented at 90 degrees to their preceding and following pairs, as is common in the family Crassulaceae, but the leaf habit differs from say Tylecodon (in which the leaves are borne in spirals and are deciduous).

The flowers are pendulous and tubular, borne at the tips of stout, rather long peduncles, mainly in short cymes. Calyx 5-partite, corolla 5-lobed. Petals united in a tube or urn that generally is longer than broad, their triangular tips more or less pointed and recurved, 10 stamens arising from corolla near base and projecting or nearly projecting from the corolla. Gynoecium comprises 5 carpels, nearly or quite free, each carpel tapering into a slender style with an obliquely capitate stigma. Each carpel contains many small (typically less than 1 milligramme when ripe) globular, brown seeds.

Taxonomy
Together with Tylecodon, Kalanchoe and Adromischus it forms a sister clade to the family's basal Crassula clade. Until the 1960s some 150 species were included in the genus Cotyledon, but subsequently it was split into at least Adromischus, Dudleya, Rosularia, and Tylecodon, leaving probably less than two dozen species in Cotyledon. Of these, about four are characteristically fynbos plants.

Cultivation and uses
Most plants in the genus, and those that used to be included in the genus Cotyledon, are poisonous, even dangerously so. Some have been implicated in stock losses among goats, pigs and poultry. However, many species have long been used in traditional medicine. They have been applied for many purposes, ranging from magic charms to removal of corns.

Cotyledon spp. are grown as garden and indoor subjects, practically independent of irrigation in all but full desert conditions, though they cannot survive poor light or bad drainage. Pests that affect them include sucking bugs, members of the suborder Auchenorrhyncha such as the mealy bug (Pseudococcus), and similar insects.  The inflorescences of the larger species are sometimes used as components of dried arrangements in floral design.

Species list
Species include (among others):
 Cotyledon adscendens
 Cotyledon barbeyi
 Cotyledon campanulata
 Cotyledon cuneata
 Cotyledon chrysantha
 Cotyledon elisae
 Cotyledon galpinii
 Cotyledon orbiculata – pig's ear, round-leafed navelwort
 Cotyledon papilaris
 Cotyledon tomentosa - bear's paw 
 Cotyledon tomentosa subsp. ladismithiensis 
 Cotyledon undulata - silver crown, silver ruffles
 Cotyledon velutina
 Cotyledon woodii

Gallery

References

Flora of Africa
Garden plants of Africa
Crassulaceae genera
Taxa named by Joseph Pitton de Tournefort
Crassulaceae
Succulent plants